Chahool is an Indian Marathi television series. It is produced by Aarav Jindal and Vinod Manikrao under the banner of Euphoria Productions. The show premiered on 12 December 2016 on Colors Marathi.

Cast 
 Akshar Kothari as Sarjerao
 Reshma Shinde as Shambhavi
 Shashwati Pimplikar as Nirmala
 Leysan Karimova as Jenny
 Madhav Abhyankar as Sarjerao's father
 Uma Gokhale as Sarjerao's mother
 Anil Gavas
 Vishal Kulthe
 Surekha Kudachi
 Radha Kulkarni
 Rajendra Shisatkar
 Vijay Mishra 
 Shilpa Wakade

References

External links 
 
 Chahool at Voot

2016 Indian television series debuts
Colors Marathi original programming
Marathi-language television shows
2017 Indian television series endings